The grey-breasted martin (Progne chalybea) is a large swallow from Central and South America.

Taxonomy and etymology
The subspecies and their distributions are:
 P. c. chalybea – (Gmelin, 1789): nominate, breeds from Mexico through Central America south to central Brazil, and on Trinidad
 P. c. warneri – Phillips, A.R., 1986: found in western Mexico
 P. c. macrorhamphus – Brooke, 1974: breeds further south in South America to central Argentina

The southern subspecies migrates north as far as Venezuela during the southern hemisphere's winter, and the nominate form also undertakes local movements after the breeding season.

Description
Adult males are a glossy blue-black with the grey-brown throat, breast and sides contrasting with the white lower underparts. Females are duller than the male, and juveniles have dull brown upperparts.

Behaviour

Breeding
The grey-breasted martin nests in cavities in banks and buildings, or old woodpecker holes. Normally, two to four eggs are laid in the lined nest, and incubated for 15–16 days, with another 22 days to fledging.

Diet
Grey-breasted martins are gregarious birds that hunt for insects in flight. Their call is a gurgly chew-chew, similar to that of the closely related Caribbean martin. The latter species is slightly larger, and has more contrasting underparts.

References

Further reading

External links

 
 
 
 
 
 

grey-breasted martin
Birds of Central America
Birds of South America
grey-breasted martin
grey-breasted martin